Louis Stephen Klimchock (born October 15, 1939) is an American former professional baseball infielder. He played parts of 12 seasons in Major League Baseball (MLB) for the Kansas City Athletics, Milwaukee Braves, Washington Senators, New York Mets and Cleveland Indians. Primarily a third baseman and second baseman, Klimchock batted left-handed and threw right-handed.

A native of Hostetter, Pennsylvania, Klimchock graduated from Latrobe High School. His 15-season pro career began in 1957 and included two stellar seasons in minor league baseball: 1958, when he batted .389 with 25 home runs in the Class C Pioneer League, and 1963, when he hit .352 with 19 long balls in only 81 games played in the Triple-A Pacific Coast League. In his most successful MLB campaign, Klimchock batted .287 in 90 games for the 1969 Indians. He also spent part of that season in the Pacific Coast League. In fact, Klimchock's dozen years of MLB service (1958–66; 1968–70) were all partial seasons, punctuated by time spent in the minor leagues.

During his MLB tenure he played in 318 games and had 669 at bats, 64 runs, 155 hits, 21 doubles, 3 triples, 13 home runs, 69 RBI, 31 walks, .232 batting average, .264 on-base percentage, .330 slugging percentage, 221 total bases, 4 sacrifice hits, 6 sacrifice flies and 5 intentional walks.

Klimchock's grandson, Mitch Nay, also a third baseman, was the 58th pick in the 2012 Major League Baseball Draft who, as of 2022, was a member of the Los Angeles Angels' organization.

References

External links

1939 births
Living people
Atlanta Crackers players
Baseball players from Pennsylvania
Cleveland Indians players
Dallas Rangers players
Denver Bears players
Grand Island A's players
Jacksonville Suns players
Kansas City Athletics players
Louisville Colonels (minor league) players
Major League Baseball infielders
Milwaukee Braves players
New York Mets players
People from Latrobe, Pennsylvania
People from Westmoreland County, Pennsylvania
Pocatello Athletics players
Portland Beavers players
Shreveport Sports players
Washington Senators (1961–1971) players